Dumitru Berciu (27 January 1907, Bobaița, Mehedinți – 1 July 1998, Bucharest) was a Romanian historian and archaeologist, honorary member of the Romanian Academy.

He conducted research in South-Eastern and Central Europe, focusing on Geto-Dacians, Thracians and Celts. Dumitru Berciu was governor of National Bank of Romania between 1934 and 1944 and the director of the Romanian Institute of Thracology in Bucharest after 1948. Later in his career, he also focused on the Neolithic and Chalcolithic periods in the Balkans. He is known for his contribution to the development of absolute chronology of prehistoric settlements in the Balkans (Romania and Bulgaria).

He was a modern Maecenas for the Romanian culture. He helped people, supported foundations, journals and institutions. In 1921, Dumitru Berciu founded the Drobeta-Turnu Severin City Library and donated over 30,000 volumes. He financially supported lifting the Drobeta-Turnu Severin Palace of Culture, where he installed his library bearing his name to date.

Life

Archaeology

Publications 
 Îndrumări în preistorie, 1939
 Contribuții la preistoria Transilvaniei, 1942
 Cercetări și săpături arheologice în județele Turda și Alba, 1945
 Contribuția lui Ion Andriesescu la preistoria Daciei și a sud-estului European, 1945
 Cetatea Alba Iulia, 1962
 Cultura Hamangia, 1966
 Zorile istoriei în Carpați și la Dunăre, 1966
 La izvoarele istoriei, 1967
 O introducere în arheologia preistorică, 1967
 The Roman Empire and its neighbours, 1967
 România înainte de Burebista, 1967
 Unitate și continuitate în istoria poporului român, 1968
 Arta traco-getică, 1969
 Lumea celților, 1970
 Daco-România, 1978
 Buridava dacică, 1981

Bibliography 
 Arta traco-getică, Editura Academiei Republicii Socialiste România, 1969
 Daco-Romania (Archaeologia mundi), Nagel, 1976

About him 
 Todorova H. Kamennomednata epoha in Bulgaria. Sofia, 1986.

See also 
 Dacia
 List of Romanian archaeologists
 Helmet of Coțofenești

References

Further reading 

 Some of Dumitru Berciu's books on Amazon.com
 Some of Dumitru Berciu's books on Amazon UK
 Some of Dumitru Berciu's books on Google Books

External links 
 Some of Dumitru Berciu's books on Amazon.com
 Some of Dumitru Berciu's books on Amazon UK
 Some of Dumitru Berciu's books on Google Books
 Dumitru Berciu in Dictionar personalitati, meditatii, maxime 
 Dumitru Berciu's Archive News 

People from Mehedinți County
Romanian archaeologists
Honorary members of the Romanian Academy
1907 births
1998 deaths
Historiography of Dacia
20th-century Romanian historians
20th-century archaeologists